Portugal was represented at the 2010 Summer Youth Olympics, held in Singapore from 14 to 26 August 2010, with a delegation of 19 competitors, who took part in 10 sports.

The country won two medals, a silver in taekwondo and a bronze in swimming. Additionally, a Portuguese athlete was part of a mixed team that won a gold medal in triathlon.

Medalists

Athletics

Canoeing

Cycling 

Cross Country

Time Trial

BMX

Road Race

Overall

Received -5 for finishing road race with all three racers

Gymnastics

Rowing

Sailing

Swimming

Table tennis 

Individual

Team

Taekwondo

Triathlon 

Boys

Girls

Mixed

References

External links 
Competitors List: Portugal

2010 in Portuguese sport
Nations at the 2010 Summer Youth Olympics
Portugal at the Youth Olympics